The 2010–11 football season was Bristol City's 113th season as a professional football club and fourth consecutive season in the second division. They competed in the Football League Championship having finished in tenth position the previous season. It was Steve Coppell's first season in charge of the club, though he resigned as manager on 12 August 2010 after just one league game in charge. Assistant Keith Millen became the club's new manager on a three-year-deal and it was his first job as a manager.

Season review
1 July – Defender Jamie McCombe joined Huddersfield Town for an undisclosed fee on a three-year contract.

1 July – Barnet winger Albert Adomah joined on a three-year contract.

9 July – Reading midfielder Kalifa Cissé joined for an undisclosed fee on a three-year deal.

17 July – City set a new club record by beating Swedish team Vallens IF, 11–1 in a pre-season friendly.

20 July – Trialist, John O'Flynn left Ashton Gate after not being offered a contract.

21 July – Ex-Peterborough United defender, Tom Williams had a trial at Ashton Gate.

23 July – City took on former City youth player and ex-Reading, Liam Rosenior on a trial.

24 July – Trialist Liam Rosenior left Ashton Gate less than 24 hours after re-joining them.

24 July – Manager, Steve Coppell, confirmed that defender Bradley Orr and midfielder Paul Hartley were to leave the club. Orr had spent more than 6 years with City and Hartley only 1.

26 July – Former Grays Athletic striker, Charlie Taylor was handed a trial with City.

28 July – Aberdeen confirmed the signing of Paul Hartley on a two-year contract making him their new club captain.

30 July – City signed Bolton Wanderers defender Nicky Hunt on a two-year deal and QPR defender Damion Stewart on a three-year deal.

30 July – Defender, Bradley Orr left on an undisclosed fee for fellow Championship side QPR.

30 July – England International goalkeeper, David James signed a one-year deal with a view to a further year.

7 August – Trialist Tom Williams signed a 6-month contract and Welsh international Sam Vokes signed a 6-month loan deal from Premier League side Wolverhampton Wanderers.

10 August – Bristol City confirmed that striker Nicky Maynard would undergo surgery on his injured knee and that his return date was unknown. On 12 August, he was ruled out for 3–4 months after having surgery on his injured knee.

12 August – Manager Steve Coppell resigned from his position with immediate effect and assistant Keith Millen is placed in charge on a three-year deal.

12 August – City signed Irish 19-year-old pair, Jimmy Keohane and Patrick Hoban on one-year deals.

18 August – City appointed former Southampton manager, Steve Wigley as assistant manager on a one-year-rolling contract.

23 August – City complete the signings of Ipswich Town forward Jon Stead and AFC Bournemouth striker Brett Pitman both on a three-year contracts.

27 August – Striker John Akinde joined City's rivals Bristol Rovers on a loan deal until 31 December 2010.

9 September – City signed Tottenham Hotspur winger Danny Rose on a youth loan deal until the end of the season. City also let defender Joe Edwards join Bath City on a youth loan deal until the end of the season and let midfielder Gavin Williams join former club Yeovil Town on a 93-day loan deal. Striker, Peter Styvar also had his contract terminated with immediate effect.

16 September – Striker Marlon Jackson joins Aldershot Town on a month loan.

17 September – Goalkeeper Stephen Henderson joins Yeovil Town on a month loan deal.

26 September – Tottenham Hotspur defender Steven Caulker signed on a youth loan deal until the end of the season.

30 September – Summer signing Tom Williams joins Colchester United on a loan deal until January and is told he will not be offered a contract beyond January.

1 October – 31 January – City had a torrid start to the season losing manager Steve Coppell after two games and hitting bottom of the Championship, things were looking bad for City. But from November until the end of December, City had a good run hitting 16th in the table and beating archrivals Cardiff City 3–0 at home. Keith Millen won manager of the month for November and defender Steven Caulker won young player of the month. City had a poor start to 2011 losing in the FA Cup 0–3 to Sheffield Wednesday and losing 0–4 also at home to Middlesbrough.

League
Bristol City opened their Championship campaign at home to newly promoted Millwall. The game saw goalkeeper David James make his home debut for the Robins. At half time, City were 1–0 down and by the end of the 90 minutes, City lost 3–0. The game saw Darren Carter sent off for Millwall, Damion Stewart sent off for City and Sam Vokes was stretchered off 13 minutes after coming on, to make his debut for City in the 2nd half. Then manager, Steve Coppell said that he may be out of action for a long period of time.
In August City went on to record 2 draws and 2 losses. However City recorded their first win of the season away on 11 September 2010, to Scunthorpe United in a 0–2 result with Albert Adomah and David Clarkson scoring the goals.
City hit bottom of the Championship table on 2 October 2010 after losing 0–3 at home to Norwich. This was the first time they had been bottom since joining the Championship. City won their first game at home to Reading on 19 October 2010. This sparked an unbeaten run of five games, drawing against QPR and Preston and beating Swansea and Middelsbrough.
Up to 3 December 2010, City lost one game in 8, losing to Leeds United at Elland Road 3–2 on 13 November 2010.

League Cup
City were drawn against League Two side Southend United away at Roots Hall. City began the game well with a goal inside the 2nd minutes, from left back Jamie McAllister. Southend drew level with a soft penalty from striker Matt Paterson on the 31st minute. City took the lead again in the second half 8 minutes from time with a well taken goal from Irish international Ivan Sproule. City again couldn't hold the lead and with 2 minutes left, Barry Corr sent the game into extra-time. Southend took the lead on the 104th minute. This was manager Steve Coppell's second defeat as City manager and also his last game in charge of the club

F.A Cup
City played League 1 side Sheffield Wednesday, on 8 January 2011 at Ashton Gate losing 0–3.

Kits
City signed a four-year deal with Adidas. City used a simple template for the home kit. It consisted of the traditional red top, white shorts and red socks. The away kit used the same template as the home kit, but with shirt and short colours reversed. The top was white with red shorts and white socks. This could be mixed with the home kit if any changes are needed. The third kit was all black.

Events
On 17 July, City set a brand new club record beating Swedish fourth division side, Vallens IF 11–1 in a pre-season friendly. The game saw a hat-trick by John Akinde, braces from Ivan Sproule and David Clarkson and other goals from Marlon Jackson, Albert Adomah, Jamal Campbell-Ryce and trialist John O'Flynn.
England goalkeeper, David James signed a one-year contract deal on 30 July 2010, surprising the footballing world.

On 12 August 2010, Steve Coppell resigned as manager with immediate effect. Assistant manager, Keith Millen, was placed in charge on a three-year deal. Coppell said he didn't feel committed to doing the job.

On 9 March 2011 chairman Steve Lansdown announced he would be stepping down as chairman at the start of the 2011–12 season allowing CEO, Colin Sexstone to take over as chairman.

Football League Championship

Standings

Squad

Players were either sold in January, had their loan spells ended or had their contracts terminated.

Statistics

|-
|colspan="14"|Players sold, loaned out/loan ended or had their contract terminated after the start of the season:

|}

Disciplinary record

Scorers

Current management

Transfers

Transfers in

Loaned in

Loaned out

Transfers out
 * Indicates the player joined the club after being released.

Fixtures and results

Pre-season

League

League Cup

FA Cup

Reserve team friendlies

Season statistics
 Overall
 Games played: 10
 Goals scored: 9
 Goals conceded: 19
 Clean sheets: 2
 Yellow cards: 15
 Red cards: 1
 Total home attendance: 59,319
 Total subs used: 24
 Fouls given: 102
 Fouls conceded: 123
 Youngest player: 18 years – Steven Caulker (against Portsmouth, 28 September 2010)
 Oldest player: 40 years – David James (against Millwall, 7 August 2010)

 Football League Championship
 Games played: 9
 Goals scored: 7
 Goals conceded: 16
 Clean sheets: 2
 Yellow cards: 12
 Red cards: 1
 Subs used: 21
 Total home attendance: 59,319
 Fouls given: 85
 Fouls conceded: 99

 FA Cup
 Games played: 0
 Goals scored: 0
 Goals conceded: 0
 Clean sheets: 0
 Yellow cards: 0
 Red cards: 0
 Subs used: 0
 Total home attendance: 0
 Fouls given: 0
 Fouls conceded: 0

 Football League Cup
 Games played: 1
 Goals scored: 2
 Goals conceded: 3
 Clean sheets: 0
 Yellow cards: 3
 Red cards: 0
 Subs used: 3
 Total home attendance: n/a
 Fouls given: 17
 Fouls conceded: 24

References

2010-11
2010–11 Football League Championship by team